Ministry of Civil Service and Insurance  (Arabic: وزارة  الخدمة المدنية والتأمينات  ) is a cabinet ministry of Yemen.

List of ministers 

 Abdel Nasser Al-Wali (17 December 2020)
 Nabil Hasan al-Faqi  (2018–2020)h
 Ahmed Luqman (2014)

See also 
 Politics of Yemen

References 

Government ministries of Yemen